Glyn Meredith (birth unknown) is a Welsh cricketer, and rugby union and professional rugby league footballer who played in the 1940s and 1950s.

Playing career

Rugby union club career
Four players from Newbridge RFC left to play rugby league for the 1949–50 Northern Rugby Football League season, they were; Tommy Harris to Hull FC, Bill Hopkins to Hull FC, Granville James to Hunslet, and Glyn Meredith to Wakefield Trinity.

County Cup Final appearances
Glyn Meredith played  in Wakefield Trinity's 17-3 victory over Keighley in the 1951 Yorkshire County Cup Final during the 1951–52 season at Fartown Ground, Huddersfield on Saturday 27 October 1951.

Club career
Glyn Meredith made his début for Wakefield Trinity during March 1950, he played his last match for Wakefield Trinity during the 1952–53 season, he appears to have scored no drop-goals (or field-goals as they are currently known in Australasia), but prior to the 1974–75 season all goals, whether; conversions, penalties, or drop-goals, scored 2-points, consequently prior to this date drop-goals were often not explicitly documented, therefore '0' drop-goals may indicate drop-goals not recorded, rather than no drop-goals scored.

References

External links
Search for "Meredith" at rugbyleagueproject.org
History of Newport RFC
Statistics at cricketarchive.com
Statistics at stats.glamorgancricket.com

Abertillery RFC players
Newbridge RFC players
Place of birth missing
Rugby league five-eighths
Wakefield Trinity players
Welsh rugby league players
Welsh rugby union players
Year of birth missing